Melitara subumbrella is a species of snout moth in the genus Melitara. It was described by Harrison Gray Dyar Jr. in 1925. It is widespread in western North America, from southern Alberta and Saskatchewan to southern Arizona, central Texas, southern New Mexico and south-eastern California.

The wingspan is 35–52 mm. The forewings are long, narrow and uniformly gray or brownish gray, generally with dark lines along the veins. The hindwings are broad and white, often with grayish or grayish-brown margins. Adults are on wing from March to May. A second generation may occur on some locations, with adults on wing from October to November.

The larvae feed on Opuntia basilaris, Opuntia ficus-indica, Opuntia macrorhiza var. macrorhiza, Opuntia atrispina, Opuntia phaeacantha, Opuntia polyacantha and Opuntia violaceae var. macrocentra. Young larvae are gregarious and prefer to feed on cactus fruit. Later instars tunnel in the cladodes and final instars may tunnel into the underground parts of the host plant. Pupation usually occurs in debris. Mature larvae are white with light purple cross-bands.

References

Phycitini
Moths of North America
Fauna of California
Moths described in 1925